Telephone Pioneers of America Park, also known as Telephone Pioneers Park or Telephone Park, is an adaptive recreation park serving the needs of physically disabled persons in Phoenix, Arizona. The park opened in 1988 from private donations collected by the Telephone Pioneers of America and is the first barrier-free park in the United States. Managed by the Phoenix Parks and Recreation Department, the park features two beep baseball fields, a therapeutic pool, a wheelchair-accessible playground, an 18-station exercise course, racquetball, volleyball, tennis, basketball and shuffleboard. Picnic facilities with open shelters known as ramadas are available.

See also
 Assistive technology and sports
 Disabled Sports USA

References

External links
 Adaptive Recreation – Official Site of the City of Phoenix Phoenix Adaptive Recreation Website
  Telephone Pioneers Park and Pool website

Parks in Phoenix, Arizona
Phoenix Points of Pride
Parasports
Parasports in the United States
1988 establishments in Arizona